Eduard Aleksanrovich Rozovsky (14 December 1926 – 26 July 2011) was a Soviet cinematographer and cameraman, whose film credits include Amphibian Man and White Sun of the Desert.

Rozovsky was an alumna of Russian State Institute of Cinematography (VGIK), which is now called the Gerasimov Institute of Cinematography. His father was Alexander Evseevich Rozovsky, and his mother was Nonna (Anna) Naumovna (née Poliak).He began his career at the Lennauchfilm film studio, where he started as a cameraman. He then joined Lenfilm studio, where he worked as a cinematographer.

Rozovsky is credited as the cinematographer on more than eighty films, spanning several decades. His best known films include White Sun of the Desert, Amphibian Man, The Seventh Companion, Kain XVIII, and Chief of Chukotka. He later became the film department chairman at the St. Petersburg State University of Cinema and Television. He was named People's Artist of Russia in 1997 for his work.

Rozovsky died in a car accident when he lost control of his Opel Astra while driving on the highway from the city of St. Petersburg to his country home in Priozersk. It is unknown if he died from the car accident or his heart stopping. He was 84 years old.

Selected Cinematography

References

1926 births
2011 deaths
Soviet cinematographers
Soviet Jews
Mass media people from Saint Petersburg
Russian cinematographers
Gerasimov Institute of Cinematography alumni
Recipients of the Order "For Merit to the Fatherland", 4th class
Recipients of the Vasilyev Brothers State Prize of the RSFSR
People's Artists of Russia
State Prize of the Russian Federation laureates
Communist Party of the Soviet Union members
Russian Jews